Juliusz Bogdan Deczkowski "Laudański" (20 April 1924 in Bydgoszcz – 22 June 1998 in Ciechocinek) was a noted Polish soldier during World War II, and later an engineer and inventor, as well as writer.

Life

Deczkowski left school in 1939, the year of the September Campaign, and joined the Home Army.  During the invasion, he became a runner with the Polish Scouting Association, which was then operating as the underground Szare Szeregi. In 1944, he took part in the Warsaw uprising as a member of the Batalion Zośka.

In 1949, during the darkest years of Stalinism in Poland, he was arrested by the Polish security service and in 1950, he was convicted and sentenced by a military court to 5 years in prison. After the death of Joseph Stalin, he was released from prison on March 23, 1953. After his release, he graduated from the Warsaw University of Technology in November 1953, and became an inventor of medical equipment. On December 29, 1956, the Supreme Court of Poland rehabilitated him, clearing his name from his 1950 conviction.

He published in Poland two books of wartime memoirs "Wspomnienia żołnierza baonu AK "Zośka" and "Wróbel" z "Kamieni na szaniec".

Works
 Juliusz Bogdan Deczkowski "Pamiętniki żołnierzy baonu "Zośka" I edition – 1957, VI edition in 1997 
 Juliusz Bogdan Deczkowski "Wspomnienia żołnierza baonu AK "Zośka", Instytut PAN, 1998 
 Juliusz Bogdan Deczkowski "Wróbel" z "Kamieni na szaniec", Ascon, 1992

See also
List of Poles

References

1924 births
1998 deaths
Military personnel from Bydgoszcz
Warsaw Uprising insurgents
Polish prisoners and detainees
People detained by the Polish Ministry of Public Security